The four-lined skink (Plestiodon tetragrammus) is a species of lizard, which is endemic to North America. It is a medium-sized member of the Plestiodon skinks.

Taxonomy
At least two subspecies are recognized, including the nominotypical subspecies:
 Long-lined skink, P. t. tetragrammus Baird, 1859
 Short-lined skink, P. t. brevilineatus (Cope, 1880)

Some herpetologists also consider the mountain skink (Plestiodon callicephalus) to be a subspecies of Plestiodon tetragrammus under the name P. t. callicephalus. Others, however, prefer to treat the mountain skink as a distinct species because its range is geographically distinct and there are morphological differences.

Description
The two subspecies can be distinguished by their color and their stripes. The long-lined skink is gray to light brown in color and has light stripes from the eyes extending to beyond its forelegs, whereas the short-lined skink is darker in color and has stripes that end before the forelegs.

Juveniles of both subspecies have — like many Plestiodon — a blue tail; this color fades with age.

Geographic range
Plestiodon tetragrammus occurs in northern Mexico and along the Mexican Gulf coast and in western and central Texas.

Habitat
Both subspecies live in lightly wooded areas, with the short-lined skink having a preference for rocky areas, whereas the long-lined skink is also found in grasslands.

Reproduction
The female lays about 5 to 12 eggs once a year, which she broods. Males develop orange (short-lined skink) to red (long-lined skink) coloration of the head during the breeding season.

References

Further reading
Baird, S.F. 1859. Descriptions of New Genera and Species of North American Lizards in the Museum of the Smithsonian Institution. Proc. Acad. Nat. Sci. Philadelphia "1858" [10]: 253-256. ("Plestiodon tetragrammus, Baird", p. 256.)
Behler, J.L., and F.W. King. 1979. The Audubon Society Field Guide to North American Reptiles and Amphibians. Knopf. New York. 743 pp. . (Eumeces tetragrammus, pp. 577–578.)
Boulenger, G.A. 1887. Catalogue of the Lizards in the British Museum (Natural History). Second Edition. Volume III. Lacertidæ, Gerrhosauridæ, Scincidæ,... Trustees of the British Museum (Natural History). (Taylor and Francis, printers.) London. xii + 575 pp. + Plates I.- XL. (Eumeces tetragrammus, pp. 375–376.)
Conant, R. 1975. A Field Guide to Reptiles and Amphibians of Eastern and Central North America, Second Edition. Houghton Mifflin. Boston. xviii + 429 pp.  (hardcover),  (paperback). (Eumeces tetragrammus, pp. 125–126 + Plate 19 + Map 82.)
Cope, E.D. 1880. On the Zoological Position of Texas. Bull. U.S. Nat. Mus. (17): 1-51. ("Eumeces brevilineatus sp. nov.", pp. 18–19.)
Smith, H.M., and E.D. Brodie Jr. 1982. Reptiles of North America: A Guide to Field Identification. Golden Press. New York. 240 pp. . (Eumeces tetragrammus, pp. 76–77.)

External links
 Info on the range (Note: the western range separated from the rest is actually the range of Plestiodon callicephalus.)

Plestiodon
Reptiles of Mexico
Reptiles of the United States
Reptiles described in 1859
Taxa named by Spencer Fullerton Baird